Robinson's of Florida was a chain of department stores on Florida's Gulf Coast and Orlando and based in St. Petersburg, Florida, starting with a store at Tyrone Square Mall in 1972. It had been founded in the 1970s as an attempt by Associated Dry Goods to emulate its upscale J. W. Robinson's stores of Southern California on the fast-growing Florida Gulf Coast. This newly created division grew to 10 locations. Rather than investing in the then-stagnant Florida market, May sold this division in 1987 to Baton Rouge based Maison Blanche. Seven of the former Robinson’s of Florida locations were subsequently sold by Maison Blanche to Dillard's* in 1991 while one was replaced and the other two became Gayfers** (which in turn was bought out by Dillard's in 1998) a year later because of Mercantile Stores.

Former Robinson's of Florida Locations

References

Defunct department stores based in Florida

Companies based in St. Petersburg, Florida
1972 establishments in Florida
1987 disestablishments in Florida